The Peter Leitch QSM Challenge Trophy (often shortened to "the Peter Leitch Challenge Trophy") is a rugby league challenge trophy that is contested when the New Zealand national rugby league team play a Pacific island side in non-Rugby League World Cup internationals. Rugby League Four Nations games, however, do count and the challenge trophy has been contested at both the 2010 and 2014 editions. The trophy is named after New Zealand businessmen, philanthropist and Rugby League advocate Peter Leitch.

History
On 15 October 2008 New Zealand Rugby League (NZRL) chairman Ray Haffenden announced that the Kiwis vs Tonga Test Match would be used to launch the Peter Leitch QSM Challenge Trophy. The NZRL wished to "acknowledged the close affinity and involvement [Leitch] has had with the Pacific Island and rugby league communities in New Zealand for many years." 

While held infrequently it was the NZRL's intention that the trophy will "be at stake in future internationals between the Kiwis and our Pacific neighbours.”

The 2011 edition was cancelled by the NZRL due to a high number of injured New Zealand players. This match would have been the first Rugby League test between the Cooks Islands and New Zealand.

Results

Results by team

See also

 List of international rugby league teams
 List of rugby league competitions
 Rugby League Four Nations

References

External links

Rugby league competitions in New Zealand
Oceanian rugby league competitions
Rugby league international tournaments